William John Towers, MM (25 March 1892 – 18 March 1962) was an Australian politician.

He was born in Collingwood to labourer John Towers and Ellen Heath. He served in the Australian Imperial Force during the First World War, seeing action at Gallipoli and in France, where he was awarded the Military Medal. On 2 July 1919 he married May Josephine Cunneen, with whom he had two children. He joined the Labor Party in 1927 and was a member of Collingwood City Council from 1930 to 1931 and from 1937 to 1952, serving twice as mayor (1939–40, 1943–45). In 1947 he was elected to the Victorian Legislative Assembly for Collingwood. He transferred to Richmond in 1958 and served until his death at Fitzroy in 1962.

References

1892 births
1962 deaths
20th-century Australian politicians
Australian Army soldiers
Australian Labor Party members of the Parliament of Victoria
Australian military personnel of World War I
Australian recipients of the Military Medal
Members of the Victorian Legislative Assembly
People from Collingwood, Victoria
Military personnel from Melbourne
Politicians from Melbourne
Victoria (Australia) local councillors
Mayors of places in Victoria (Australia)